The 1988 United States presidential election in Missouri took place on November 8, 1988. All 50 states and the District of Columbia, were part of the 1988 United States presidential election. Voters chose 11 electors to the Electoral College, which selected the president and vice president.

Missouri was won by incumbent United States Vice President George H. W. Bush of Texas, who was running against Massachusetts Governor Michael Dukakis. Bush ran with Indiana Senator Dan Quayle as Vice President, and Dukakis ran with Texas Senator Lloyd Bentsen.

Missouri weighed in for this election as almost 4% more Democratic than the national average.

The presidential election of 1988 was a very partisan election for Missouri, with more than 99% of the electorate voting for either the Democratic or Republican parties, and only three parties total appearing on the ballot. In typical form for the time, the more rural counties in Missouri turned out for the Republican candidate, while the more populated centers of the city of St. Louis (though, notably, not St. Louis County), and Kansas City, voted overwhelmingly Democratic. , this is the last election in which St. Louis County voted for a Republican presidential candidate.

Bush won the election in the battleground state of Missouri by a narrow 4-point margin, far below the margin of victory Reagan achieved just four years earlier. Bush's loss of many northern rural counties, combined with Dukakis's strong performance in the St. Louis city area, resulted in an unusually close result in the state given the national environment. A longtime bellwether state, Missouri voted for the national winner of every presidential election from 1904 to 2004, except 1956.

Through the passage of some controversial economic programs spearheaded by President Ronald Reagan (collectively called "Reaganomics"), the mid-to-late 1980s saw a period of economic growth and stability. The hallmark for Reaganomics was, in part, the wide-scale deregulation of corporate interests, and tax cuts for the wealthy. Dukakis ran on a socially liberal platform, and advocated for higher economic regulation and environmental protection. Bush ran on a very similar platform to Reagan, boosting his support with social conservatives.

Results

Results by county

See also
 United States presidential elections in Missouri
 Presidency of George H. W. Bush

References

Missouri
1988
1988 Missouri elections